Nicholas K. Berk (born May 11, 1980), also known by his ring name Nicky Benz, is an American independent professional wrestler, best known for his work in Combat Zone Wrestling, where he is a former CZW World Heavyweight and Iron Man Champion.

Professional wrestling career
Berk was born in Philadelphia, Pennsylvania. He is a regular worker for Combat Zone Wrestling (CZW), as well as Force One Pro Wrestling, under his real name and sometimes under the stage name Nicky Benz. He was featured in the documentary "On the Road with Raven", where he and Raven are shown setting up an angle and later having a match. In 2005, Berk, had several tryout matches with World Wrestling Entertainment (WWE) in which he was squashed by Carlito, Val Venis Mr. Kennedy and others. None of these tryouts resulted in any contractual interest by the company. On the November 27, 2006 edition of WWE Raw Nick Berk played a "comedian" in a skit that made fun of comedian Michael Richards.

ISPW 2022 - present

Nicky Benz is currently the manager for longtime independent wrestling star, Michael Mars. Benz helped Mars beat a young TJ Epixx, who was managed by ECW legend HC Loc in August of 2022. During the match Nicky slipped on padding outside the ring and tore his khaki jacket.  Benz previously applied to be the manager for soon to be heavyweight champ, Justin Corino, but was beat out by former WWE tough enough star Maven (wrestler)

Championships and accomplishments
Blackball'd Wrestling Organization
BWO Cruiserweight Championship (1 time)
Championship Wrestling from Florida
NWA Florida Tag Team Championship (1 time) - with Z-Barr
Combat Zone Wrestling
CZW Iron Man Championship (1 time)
CZW World Heavyweight Championship (1 time)
NWA Force One Pro Wrestling
NWA Force 1 Heritage Championship (1 time)
Force One Iron League Junior Heavyweight Championship (1 time)
Force One Iron League Championship (1 time)
Hardway Wrestling
HW Hardcore Championship (1 time)
HW Light Heavyweight Championship (1 time)
Jersey All Pro Wrestling
JAPW Light Heavyweight Championship (2 times)
Pro Wrestling Illustrated
PWI ranked him #353 of the top 500 singles wrestlers in the PWI 500 in 2010
Thunder Zone Wrestling
TZW Light Heavyweight Championship (1 time)
USA Xtreme Wrestling
UXW Xtreme Championship (1 time, current)

References

External links
 Online World of Wrestling profile
 Cagematch profile 

1980 births
American male professional wrestlers
Living people
Professional wrestlers from Pennsylvania
Sportspeople from Philadelphia
CZW World Heavyweight Champions
CZW Iron Man Champions
20th-century professional wrestlers
21st-century professional wrestlers